Immacolata e Concetta (internationally released as Immacolata and Concetta: The Other Jealousy) is a 1980 Italian drama film directed by Salvatore Piscicelli.  The feature debut film of Piscicelli, it won the Silver Leopard at the Locarno International Film Festival. For her performance Ida Di Benedetto was awarded Silver Ribbon for best actress.

Cast
 Ida Di Benedetto as Immacolata
 Marcella Michelangeli as Concetta
 Tommaso Bianco as Ciro
 Lucio Allocca as Pasquale
 Lucia Ragni		
 Biancamaria Mastrominico	
 Nina De Padova	
 Linda Moretti	
 Antonio Ferrante	
 Berto Lama		
 Cetty Sommella

See also  
 List of Italian films of 1980

References

External links

1980 films
1980 LGBT-related films
Italian LGBT-related films
Films directed by Salvatore Piscicelli
1980 directorial debut films
1980s Italian-language films
1980s Italian films